Roger Adrià Oliveras (born 18 April 1998) is a Spanish cyclist, who currently rides for UCI ProTeam .

In August 2020, on stage 3 of the Vuelta a Burgos, Adrià was part of the stage's main breakaway of nine riders. Late into the stage, he dropped his fellow breakaway riders and nearly stayed away for the surprise win, but he was caught on the slopes of Picón Blanco with several kilometers left by the general classification contenders. Nevertheless, Adrià was noted for his solo effort and won the stage's combativity award.

Major results  

 2017
 7th Overall Volta a Portugal do Futuro
1st  Young rider classification
 2018
 2nd Time trial, National Under-23 Road Championships
 2019
 1st Gran Premio San Lorenzo
 1st Memorial Pascual Momparler
 National Under-23 Road Championships
4th Road race
5th Time trial
 2020
 1st  Young rider classification, Tour de Serbie
 3rd Overall Giro del Friuli-Venezia Giulia
2021
 3rd Prueba Villafranca - Ordiziako Klasika
 4th Overall Okolo Slovenska
 5th Road race, National Road Championships
 7th Overall Vuelta Asturias
2022
 1st Stage 2 Route d'Occitanie
 5th Road race, National Road Championships
 9th Mont Ventoux Dénivelé Challenge
2023
 5th Trofeo Andratx–Mirador D'es Colomer
 7th Muscat Classic

Grand Tour general classification results timeline

References

External links 
 
 

1998 births
Living people
Spanish male cyclists
Cyclists from Barcelona